Mircea Chelaru (born 3 July 1949) is a Romanian general and the last leader of the Romanian National Unity Party (PUNR) after Gheorghe Funar resigned as leader.
After the PUNR was absorbed by the PC (Conservative Party), Chelaru stepped down from his position.

He was a member of the Alliance for the Union of Romanians (AUR). However, he is now a member of the Romanian Nationhood Party (PNR).

References

External links
 Șefii Statului Major General al Armatei Române
 PUNR – Biografia lui Mircea Chelaru

Chiefs of the General Staff of Romania
Romanian Land Forces generals
Romanian National Unity Party politicians
Alliance for the Union of Romanians politicians
Leaders of political parties in Romania
Living people
1949 births